Jana Novotná was the defending champion but lost in the quarterfinals to Nathalie Tauziat.

Lindsay Davenport won in the final 6–0, 7–5 against Tauziat.

Seeds
A champion seed is indicated in bold text while text in italics indicates the round in which that seed was eliminated. The top four seeds received a bye to the second round.

  Jana Novotná (quarterfinals)
  Monica Seles (quarterfinals)
  Lindsay Davenport (champion)
  Iva Majoli (semifinals)
  Mary Pierce (second round)
  Mary Joe Fernández (first round)
  Brenda Schultz-McCarthy (second round)
  Lisa Raymond (quarterfinals)

Draw

Final

Section 1

Section 2

External links
 1997 Ameritech Cup Draw

Ameritech Cup
1997 WTA Tour
1997 in sports in Illinois
1997 in American tennis